Atlanta Silverbacks Women was an American women's soccer team that played from 2005 until 2016. The team played in the USL W-League from 2005 until the league folded after the 2015 season. For the 2016 season they played in the Women's Premier Soccer League. They won the W-League championship in 2011 and the WPSL Southeast championship in 2016.

The team played its home games at Atlanta Silverbacks Park, a soccer-specific stadium in Chamblee, Georgia, 15 miles northeast of downtown Atlanta. The team's colors were red and black.

Players

2015 Roster

Notable former players
  Christine Latham
  Candace Chapman
  Sharolta Nonen
  Lyndsey Patterson
  Melissa Tancredi
  Michelle Betos
  Elizabeth Guess
  Ashley Phillips

Year-by-year

Honors
 WPSL Southeast champions 2016
 USL W-League National Champions 2011
 USL W-League Atlantic Division Champions 2011
 USL W-League Atlantic Division Champions 2010
 USL W-League Atlantic Division Champions 2009
 USL W-League Atlantic Division Champions 2008
 USL W-League Central Conference Champions 2007
 USL W-League Atlantic Division Champions 2007

References

External links
 Atlanta Silverbacks on USL Soccer

Women's soccer clubs in the United States
Women
S
Defunct soccer clubs in Georgia (U.S. state)
2005 establishments in Georgia (U.S. state)
Association football clubs established in 2005
Association football clubs disestablished in 2016